Klein-Pöchlarn is a town in the district of Melk in the Austrian state of Lower Austria.

Geography
The town is located on the left of the Danube. For reaching the other side of the river, there is a modern bridge between Pöchlarn and Klein-Pöchlarn.

Population

References

Cities and towns in Melk District
Populated places on the Danube